The William Gibbs House is a historic house in Waltham, Massachusetts.  Built c. 1830–54, this -story wood-frame house is one Waltham's few temple-front Greek Revival houses.  It has four two-story Corinthian columns supporting a fully pedimented gable with a deep, dentillated cornice.  It was probably built in the 1840s by William Gibbs, a hat manufacturer, and was sold by him to another hat maker who lost it to foreclosure.

The house was listed on the National Register of Historic Places in 1989.

See also
National Register of Historic Places listings in Waltham, Massachusetts

References

Houses on the National Register of Historic Places in Waltham, Massachusetts
Houses completed in 1845
Houses in Waltham, Massachusetts